The M1299 is an American prototype 155 mm turreted self-propelled howitzer developed by BAE Systems in 2019 under the Extended Range Cannon Artillery (ERCA) program. It is based on the M109A7 self-propelled howitzer, and was primarily designed for the purpose of improving the M109's effective range.

History 
The Extended Range Cannon Artillery program was designed to produce a self-propelled howitzer system with an improved range and rate of fire compared to the existing M109A7 howitzer, in response to developments of Russian and Chinese artillery systems, which had become capable of outranging American systems.

Using the same principles, the Extended Range Cannon Artillery was developed. BAE Systems was given a $45 million contract in 2019 to incorporate the ERCA's cannon into a M109 chassis, which was unveiled at that year's Association for the United States Army.

Increased range and accuracy is accomplished by having a longer barrel, at 58 calibers long, and by using the XM1113 rocket-assisted artillery shell.

According to the United States Army, the howitzer was to be completed in 2021 and undergo operational assessment in 2023. It is expected to be fitted with an autoloader in 2025, which could increase its rate of fire from 3 to 10 rounds per minute.

Design

Gun system 

The M1299 is armed with a new 155 mm L/58 calibre long, a 9.1 m gun tube, XM907 gun, designed by Benét Laboratories that will fire the XM1113 rocket-assisted round. When fitted, an autoloader will allow rates of fire of up to 10 rounds per minute. Originally the autoloader was planned to carry 31 rounds and be in service by 2024. As designed, it was too large for the vehicle, so it was reduced to a 23-round capacity for better weight, center of gravity, and "onboard kills".

See also 
XM2001 Crusader, a U.S. Army self-propelled howitzer canceled in 2002
XM1203 Non-Line-of-Sight Cannon, a U.S. Army self-propelled howitzer of the Future Combat Systems Manned Ground Vehicles program canceled in 2009
Panzerhaubitze 2000, the self-propelled howitzer of the German army
K-9 Thunder, the self-propelled howitzer of the Korean Armed Forces
Next Generation Combat Vehicle, an on-going U.S. Army combat vehicle acquisition program
AHS Krab, self-propelled howitzer designed in Poland
T-155 Fırtına self-propelled howitzer designed in Turkey
AS-90 self-propelled howitzer designed in UK
2S35 Koalitsiya-SV self-propelled howitzer designed in Russia
PLZ-05 self-propelled howitzer designed in China
SSPH Primus self-propelled howitzer designed in Singapore
Type 99 155 mm self-propelled howitzer self-propelled howitzer designed in Japan

References

External links 

155 mm artillery
Self-propelled howitzers of the United States
Tracked self-propelled howitzers
BAE Systems land vehicles
Post–Cold War armored fighting vehicles of the United States